Rugby sevens at the 2015 Southeast Asian Games will be held in Choa Chu Kang Stadium, Singapore from 6 to 7 June 2015.

Participating nations
A total of 131 athletes from six nations will be competing in rugby sevens at the 2015 Southeast Asian Games:

Competition schedule
The following is the competition schedule for the rugby sevens competitions:

Medalists

Medal table

References

External links